Chalcosyrphus annulatus is a species of hoverfly in the family Syrphidae.

Distribution
India, Laos, Malaysia.

References

Eristalinae
Insects described in 1913
Diptera of Asia
Taxa named by Enrico Adelelmo Brunetti